The Serie B 1988–89 was the fifty-seventh tournament of this competition played in Italy since its creation.

Teams
Ancona, Monza, Licata, Cosenza and Reggina had been promoted from Serie C, while Avellino and Empoli had been relegated from Serie A.

Final classification

Results

Tie-breakers

Promotion tie-breaker

Cremonese promoted to Serie A.

Relegation tie-breaker

Empoli relegated to Serie C1.

References and sources
Almanacco Illustrato del Calcio - La Storia 1898-2004, Panini Edizioni, Modena, September 2005

Serie B seasons
2
Italy